John Taylor (birth unknown) is a former professional rugby league footballer who played in the 1950s and 1960s.

Playing career

International honours 
John Taylor was selected for Great Britain while at Hull Kingston Rovers for the 1962 Great Britain Lions tour of Australia and New Zealand, becoming Hull Kingston Rovers' first Australasian tourist.

County honours 
While at Castleford, John Taylor played  in Yorkshire's 15–9 victory over New Zealand at Wheldon Road, Castleford on Monday 20 September 1965.

County League appearances 
John Taylor played in Castleford's victory in the Yorkshire County League during the 1964–65 season.

County Cup Final appearances 
John Taylor played right-, i.e. number 12, in Hull Kingston Rovers' 2–12 defeat by Hunslet in the 1962 Yorkshire County Cup Final during the 1962–63 season at Headingley Rugby Stadium, Leeds on Saturday 27 October 1962.

BBC2 Floodlit Trophy Final appearances 
John Taylor played right-, i.e. number 12, in Castleford's 4–0 victory over St. Helens in the 1965 BBC2 Floodlit Trophy Final during the 1965–66 season at Knowsley Road, St. Helens on Tuesday 14 December 1965.

Club career 
Through a one match ban, John Taylor missed Hull Kingston Rovers 5–13 defeat by Widnes in the 1964 Challenge Cup Final during the 1963–64 season at Wembley Stadium, London on Saturday 9 May 1964, he left Hull Kingston Rovers for Castleford in 1965 for a transfer fee of £6,000 (based on increases in average earnings, this would be approximately £197,500 in 2013).

References

External links 
 Search for "Taylor" at rugbyleagueproject.org
 Profile at thecastlefordtigers.co.uk

Castleford Tigers players
Great Britain national rugby league team players
Hull Kingston Rovers players
Place of birth missing
Rugby league locks
Year of birth missing
York Wasps players
Yorkshire rugby league team players